Yaaqoub Al-Saadi (born June 13, 1996) is an Emirati swimmer. He competed at the 2016 Summer Olympics in the men's 100 metre backstroke; his time of 59.58 seconds in the heats did not qualify him for the semifinals.

References

1996 births
Living people
Emirati male swimmers
Olympic swimmers of the United Arab Emirates
Swimmers at the 2016 Summer Olympics
Male backstroke swimmers